Spind is a former municipality that was located in the old Vest-Agder county in Norway. The  municipality existed from 1893 until 1965. It was located on the Spind peninsula in the western part of the present-day municipality of Farsund in Agder county. The peninsula lies between the Lygndalsfjord and the Rosfjord. The administrative centre of Spind was located in the village of Rødland where Spind Church is located.

Name
The municipality (originally the parish) is named Spind, which means "lump" or "knoll", probably because the land has many rolling hills.

History
The municipality of Spind was established on 17 October 1893 when it was split from the municipality of Herad. At the time of its establishment, Spind had 1,410 inhabitants. On 1 July 1916, a small part of the neighboring municipality of Austad (population: 4) was transferred to Spind. During the 1960s, there were many municipal mergers across Norway due to the work of the Schei Committee. On 1 January 1965, Spind (population: 606) was merged with the neighboring municipalities of Herad and Lista and with the town of Farsund to form a new, larger municipality of Farsund.

Government
All municipalities in Norway, including Spind, are responsible for primary education (through 10th grade), outpatient health services, senior citizen services, unemployment and other social services, zoning, economic development, and municipal roads.  The municipality was governed by a municipal council of elected representatives, which in turn elected a mayor.

Municipal council
The municipal council  of Spind was made up of representatives that were elected to four year terms.  The party breakdown of the final municipal council was as follows:

See also
List of former municipalities of Norway

References

External links

Weather information for Spind 

Farsund
Former municipalities of Norway
1893 establishments in Norway
1965 disestablishments in Norway